{{Infobox radio station
| name             = KRVX
| logo             = 
| city             = Wimbledon, North Dakota
| area             = Jamestown-Valley City
| branding         = 103.1 The Raven
| frequency        = 103.1 MHz 
| translator       = 97.1 K246AM (Jamestown, relays HD2)102.7 K274BH (Valley City, relays HD2)
| airdate          = 2005
| format           = Classic rock
| subchannels      = HD2: Classic hits "Ted FM" HD3: Ag News/Talk (Simulcast of KQLX)
| erp              = 99,000 watts
| haat             = 
| class            = C1
| facility_id      = 164198
| coordinates      = 
| callsign_meaning = K RaVen X| former_callsigns =
| affiliations     = 
| owner            = Ingstad Family Media
| licensee         = i3G Media, Inc.
| sister_stations  = KOVC, KQDJ, KQDJ-FM, KXGT, KYNU
| webcast          = Listen LiveListen Live (HD2)
| website          = NewsDakota.com 
}}KRVX''' (103.1 FM, "103.1 The Raven") is a radio station licensed to Wimbledon, North Dakota, serving the Jamestown and Valley City area.  The station is owned by Ingstad Family Media, through licensee Two Rivers Broadcasting, Inc. Positioned as "North Dakota's Classic Rock," KRVX airs a classic rock music format.

KRVX studios are co-located with its sister stations KQDJ, KQDJ-FM, and KYNU on 2625 8th Ave SW in Jamestown while the stations’ transmitter site is located in Eckelson.

The station was assigned the KRVX call letters by the Federal Communications Commission on July 7, 2005.

KRVX-HD2
In February 2018 KRVX launched a classic hits format on its HD2 subchannel, branded as "Ted FM" (format moved from KXGT 98.3 FM Carrington, which switched to classic country).

Translators

References

External links
News Dakota

RVX
Classic rock radio stations in the United States
Barnes County, North Dakota
2005 establishments in North Dakota